Open for Business may refer to:

Open for Business (blog), online news blog with a technology focus.
Open for Business (TV series), Irish business series
Open for Business, 2006 album by Timz
The Sims 2: Open for Business, expansion pack for The Sims 2